Wayne Foreman (born 16 May 1955) is  a former Australian rules footballer who played with Footscray and Essendon in the Victorian Football League (VFL).

Notes

External links 		
		
Wayne Foreman's profile at Essendonfc.com		
				
		
Living people		
1955 births		
		
Australian rules footballers from Victoria (Australia)		
Western Bulldogs players		
Essendon Football Club players
Sunshine Football Club (VFA) players